John Robert Arnold,  (born 1 November 1933) is a retired Anglican priest and author.

Arnold was educated at Christ's Hospital and Sidney Sussex College, Cambridge. He was ordained in 1960 and was then a curate at Holy Trinity, Millhouses, Sheffield then chaplain and  lecturer at the University of Southampton. From 1972 to 1978 he was secretary of the Board for Mission and Unity for the General Synod of the Church of England when he became Dean of Rochester. In 1989 he became Dean of Durham, a position he held until his retirement in 2002. 1986-1992 he was vice-president, 1992-1997 president of the Conference of European Churches. His papers are currently held at the archive of the Cambridge Center For Christianity World Wide.

Selected works
 Eucharistic Liturgy of Taizé (1962)
 Strategist for the Spirit (1985)
 Rochester Cathedral (1987)
 Preaching from Cathedrals (1998)
 Life Conquers Death (2007)

References

External links

People educated at Christ's Hospital
Alumni of Sidney Sussex College, Cambridge
Academics of the University of Southampton
Deans of Rochester
Deans of Durham
Officers of the Order of the British Empire
1933 births
Living people